The 1997 NCAA Division II Lacrosse Championship was the 13th annual tournament to determine the national champions of NCAA Division II men's college lacrosse in the United States.

The final, and only match of the tournament, was played at Motamed Field at Adelphi University in Garden City, New York. 

NYIT defeated hosts Adelphi in the championship game, 18–11, to claim the Bears' first Division II national title.

Bracket

See also
1997 NCAA Division I Men's Lacrosse Championship
1997 NCAA Division I Women's Lacrosse Championship
1997 NCAA Division III Men's Lacrosse Championship

References

NCAA Division II Men's Lacrosse Championship
NCAA Division II Men's Lacrosse Championship
NCAA Division II Men's Lacrosse